Battle River—Camrose was a federal electoral district in Alberta, Canada, that was represented in the House of Commons of Canada from 1953 to 1968.

This riding was created in 1952 from parts of Battle River, and Camrose ridings. It was abolished in 1966 when it was redistributed into Battle River, Vegreville and Wetaskiwin ridings.

Election results

See also 

 List of Canadian federal electoral districts
 Past Canadian electoral districts

External links 
 

Former federal electoral districts of Alberta